The Finland men's national field hockey team represents Finland in men's international field hockey and is controlled by the Finnish Field Hockey Association the governing body for field hockey in Finland.

Competitive record

Summer Olympics

European championships

See also
Finland women's national field hockey team

References

European men's national field hockey teams
Field hockey
National team
Men's sport in Finland